The Annie Lennox Collection is the first greatest hits album by Scottish singer-songwriter Annie Lennox. It was released on 17 February 2009 and contains two brand-new songs, "Shining Light", originally a song by Ash, and a cover version of Keane's B-side "Closer Now", retitled "Pattern of My Life". The artwork was shot by Canadian rock singer Bryan Adams.

Background
About the album, Lennox said, "It seems like the time has come to release the Collection this year. The songs are timeless, and have become "classics" in their own right."

Finishing her contract with Sony BMG, Lennox released the compilation album The Annie Lennox Collection. Initially intended for release in September 2008, the release date was pushed back several months to allow her to recuperate from a back injury. It was eventually released in the United States on 17 February 2009 by Arista Records and in the United Kingdom and Europe on 9 March 2009 by RCA Records. Included on the album are songs from her four solo albums, one from the Bram Stoker's Dracula soundtrack and two new songs. One of these is a cover version of the Northern Irish band Ash's 2001 song "Shining Light", which became Lennox's first UK top forty solo hit since 1995, peaking at number 39. The other is a cover version of the English band Keane's song "Closer Now" (originally the B-side to their 2000 single "Call Me What You Like"), retitled "Pattern of My Life". The track was released digitally in the UK on 24 May 2009 as the album's second single.

A limited three-disc edition of the album was released only in the UK on the same day, containing a second CD with unreleased live cover versions of R.E.M.'s "Everybody Hurts" with Alicia Keys and Jimmy Cliff's "Many Rivers to Cross".  Also on the disc is Lennox's Academy Award-winning song "Into the West" from the 2003 film The Lord of the Rings: The Return of the King.  Other songs were drawn from multi-performer compilation albums including "Ev'ry Time We Say Goodbye", written by Cole Porter,  originally released in 1990 on Red Hot + Blue, "Mama", written by the Sugarcubes, originally released in 1995 on Ain't Nuthin' But A She Thing, the traditional lullaby "Dream Angus" on Carnival! in 1997 and "Ladies of the Canyon" on A Tribute To Joni Mitchell, planned for release in 1999, but not released until 2007.  The Paula Cole-penned "Hush, Hush, Hush" was taken from Herbie Hancock's 2005 album Possibilities  The third disc is a DVD compilation containing most of Lennox's solo videos from 1992 to 2009 and two live performances.

Commercial performance
The Annie Lennox Collection debuted at number two on the UK Albums Chart, Lennox's fifth top-10 solo album and fourth top-three album. It spent seven weeks in the top 10 and 25 weeks in the top 100. The album peaked at number 34 on the Billboard 200 in the US. Elsewhere, it reached the top five in Ireland, Italy, New Zealand and Norway, and the top 10 in Australia, Croatia and Denmark.

Track listing

Charts

Weekly charts

Year-end charts

Certifications

References

2009 greatest hits albums
Albums produced by Glen Ballard
Albums produced by Stephen Lipson
Annie Lennox albums
Arista Records compilation albums
RCA Records compilation albums